A phlegmatized explosive is an explosive that has had an agent (a phlegmatizer) added to stabilize or desensitize it. Phlegmatizing usually improves the handling properties of an explosive (e.g. when munitions are filled in factories. Alfred Nobel's breakthrough was the use of cellulose nitrate to phlegmatize nitroglycerine. The phlegmatized product is dynamite.

TNT explosive can itself be used to phlegmatize more sensitive explosives such as RDX (to form Cyclotol), HMX (to form Octol) or PETN (to form Pentolite). Other typical phlegmatizing agents include paraffin wax (5% used in OKFOL and Composition H6), paper or even water (used in water gel explosives). Such agents are nearly always flammable themselves (therefore adding fuel to the blast) or will at least boil off easily. Typically, a small amount of phlegmatizing agent is used e.g. Composition B, which has 1% paraffin wax added, or the Russian RGO hand grenade which contains 90 grams of "A-IX-1" explosive, comprising 96% RDX and 4% paraffin wax by weight. Another example of use is the VS-50 antipersonnel mine, which contains an explosive filling of 43 grams of RDX, again phlegmatized by combining it with 10% paraffin wax by weight.

References

Explosives